Whale Cove can refer to:

Whale Cove, Newfoundland and Labrador
Whale Cove, Nunavut
Whale Cove (Oregon), south of Depoe Bay, Oregon